was a Japanese football player and manager. He played for Japan national team. He also managed Japan's national team.

Biography
Okano coached the Japan national team from 1961 to 1971, becoming the manager for the 1970-1971 season. From 1998 to 2002 he served as the president of the Japan Football Association. Okano was a member of the International Olympic Committee (IOC) from 1990 to 2012, becoming an honorary member in 2012.

Playing career
Okano was born in Taito, Tokyo on August 28, 1931. His parents ran a well-established confectionery shop in Tokyo’s Ueno district. During the war his family escaped from the American air raids to Gunma Prefecture, but Okano stayed to attend a high school. In April 1949 he enrolled to the University of Tokyo and joined a football club there. In 1953 his team won the first national university championships. In 1955, he was selected Japan national team. He played 2 games for Japan in 1955.

Coaching career

In March 1957, Okano graduated in psychology from the Faculty of Letters, and in early 1961 spent three months in West Germany to train as a football coach. Upon return he was appointed as a Japan national team coach under manager Ken Naganuma, he also served as an interpreter for German coach Dettmar Cramer. In 1968 Summer Olympics, Japan won the bronze medals. In 2018, this team was selected Japan Football Hall of Fame. In 1970, he was promoted to the manager as successor Naganuma. He managed at 1970 Asian Games. However, at 1972 Summer Olympics qualification in 1971, following Japan's failure to qualify for 1972 Summer Olympics, Okano resigned.

In October 1974 he joined the Japan Football Association (JFA). Soon after that he became executive director of the Japanese Olympic Committee (JOC); in 1977 he was appointed as its general secretary and in 1989 as its executive director. In September 1990 he became a member of the IOC, and in 1995 of the FIFA Olympic Tournaments' Organizing Committee. He also served as 9th president of JFA (1998-2002) and 1st president of East Asian Football Federation (2004-2006).

In 2005, Okano was selected Japan Football Hall of Fame. Okano died from lung cancer on 2 February 2017 at a Tokyo hospital. He was 85.

National team statistics

Honour 
 Blue Ribbon Medal of Honour (1990)
 IOC Silver Pin (1998)
 Blue Dragon Award (South Korea) (2003)
 The Order of the Rising Sun, Gold Rays with Neck Ribbon (2004)
 Japan Football Hall of Fame (2005)
 Honorary member of the International Olympic Committee (2012 - 2017)

References

External links

 
 Japan National Football Team Database
Japan Football Hall of Fame at Japan Football Association
Japan Football Hall of Fame (Japan team at 1968 Olympics) at Japan Football Association

1931 births
2017 deaths
University of Tokyo alumni
Association football people from Tokyo
Japanese footballers
Japan international footballers
Japanese football managers
Japan national football team managers
International Olympic Committee members
Recipients of the Order of the Rising Sun, 3rd class
Association football forwards
Deaths from lung cancer